Myrosma is a genus of plants. Only one species is currently recognized: Myrosma cannifolia, the cannaleaf myrosma, native to northern South America (Brazil, Peru, Bolivia, Suriname, French Guiana, Guyana) as well as Trinidad and the Windward Islands. It is considered naturalized in Haiti, Puerto Rico and the Leeward Islands.

References

Marantaceae
Monotypic Zingiberales genera
Flora of the Caribbean
Flora of South America